ITV2 is a British free-to-air television channel owned by ITV Digital Channels, a division of ITV plc. It was launched on 7 December 1998. For a number of years, it had the largest audience share after the five analogue terrestrial stations, a claim now held by its sister service ITV3 both of which are freely available to a majority of households.

The channel is primarily aimed at the 16/18–34 age group, just like BBC Three, E4 and Sky Max and is known for American programming such as  adult animations Family Guy, American Dad! and Bob's Burgers, repeats of recently aired episodes of soap operas and other entertainment programming from ITV such as Coronation Street and Emmerdale; 60-second entertainment news bulletin FYI Daily, which airs in-between films; and original programming such as Celebrity Juice and Love Island. In November 2021, the channel moved into the true-crime genre with Social Media Murders a three-part documentary series with a different case examined every night over three days.

Broadcasting

Satellite
Freesat UK: Channel 113 (HD) & Channel 114 (+1)
Sky UK: Channel 118 (SD/HD), Channel 218 (+1) & Channel 816 (HD/SD)

Cable
Virgin Media: Channel 115 (SD), Channel 116 (+1) & Channel 176 (HD)

History 
Prior to the launch of Channel 4 in 1982, the name "ITV2" had sometimes been used to refer informally to an envisioned second commercial network in the UK. However, the name resurfaced in the late 1990s for very different reasons. The launch of digital terrestrial television services in the UK saw each existing analogue terrestrial broadcaster given a slice of bandwidth with which to carry their existing service after analogue switch-off with space left over for new channels. Whilst strictly speaking this space belonged to each regional contractor for use within their own region, ITV had undergone a series of buy-outs earlier on in the decade; the three players operating the majority of the network, Granada, Carlton, and United News & Media, jointly launched ITV2 in 1998 to be broadcast to most of the country as a uniform service. Whilst free-to-air, it was marketed alongside their own subscription based ONdigital platform. Other ITV licensees, SMG, UTV and GMTV launched their own services in the space (see below).

While ITV2 is now a popular entertainment channel, at its launch in 1998 it was a mixed genre channel. Much of the original content in its launch schedule was current affairs related programming fronted by ITV newscasters. Katie Derham presented a weekly media programme called Wide Angle, John Suchet fronted a weekly current affairs discussion programme called Who, What, Why, and Trevor McDonald presented an interview series, Trevor McDonald Meets.... Other programmes included Midsomer Murders, Inspector Morse, Judge Judy, omnibus editions of ITV soaps Emmerdale and Coronation Street, and a Saturday football results service.

In June 2004, ITV plc announced that they were going to double the channel's programme budget, and would add more American series and movies. On 1 November 2004, in an attempt to launch ITV3 on Sky, ITV2 moved from 175 to 118 on Sky after ITV plc bought GSkyB for £10 million. As a result, Plus was permanently closed down, with its EPG slot taken by ITV3.

ITV plc launched a one-hour timeshift channel of ITV2 on Monday, 30 October 2006. The company is looking to its digital channels to shore up revenues as the ITV Network suffers a decline in viewers. ITV3 +1 was launched on the same day.

ITV2 and its one-hour timeshift channel began broadcasting 24 hours a day on 17 March 2008. The hours formerly held by GMTV2 were moved to ITV4.

From 11 January 2011, ITV2 +1 on the Freeview platform has changed its broadcasting hours to  until  On 1 June 2011, an additional hour was added in England, Northern Ireland and Scotland, allowing ITV2 +1 to start at  On 2 August 2011, ITV2 +1 began to broadcast 24 hours a day on Freeview across the UK, using an eleventh stream created on mux A.

As part of the changes, ITV2 +1 swapped slots on Sky's electronic programme guide with Men & Motors, resulting in the timeshift channel making a significant jump from channel 184 to 131. It is now Sky 218.

GMTV2 programming moved from ITV2 to ITV4. The strand continues to be simulcast on the CITV channel.

On 20 August 2008, ITV2 unveiled a new look. The logo was given a 3D look, with six new idents.

ITV2 was launched on UPC Ireland in the Republic of Ireland on 4 January 2010, marking the first time the channel has been officially available in the country. The channel had already been (and remains) available to Irish viewers on free-to-air satellite for some time, however it is still not listed in the Sky electronic programme guide. On 1 April 2011, ITV2 was removed from UPC Ireland along with ITV3 and ITV4 due to the expiry of a carriage agreement between UPC and ITV. UPC Ireland claim that ITV is not in a position to renegotiate the deal because ITV had struck a deal with another channel provider to provide it with exclusive rights to air certain content from the channels. Conversely, UPC Ireland also claims to have been in discussions right up to the last moment to continue broadcasting the channels. ITV2, ITV3 and ITV4 were restored to the UPC Ireland line-up on 20 December 2011. Virgin Media One and its sister channel Virgin Media Two already hold carriage agreement to air certain ITV content within the Republic of Ireland, alternatively UTV is available within the Republic. ITV2 is available along with ITV3 and ITV4 within Switzerland, all three channels are available on SwisscomTV and UPC Cablecom. ITV2 is registered to broadcast within the European Union/EEA through ALIA in Luxembourg.

ITV2 was made available on Freeview in the Channel Islands on 29 February 2012, a few months after ITV plc bought Channel Television from Yattendon Group plc.

In March 2022, ITV announced that their new reality game show Loaded in Paradise, which sees teams in Greece trying to win a chance of spending the prize pot of 50,000 euros, would be one of the first ITV2 shows to debut on their new streaming service ITVX before getting a terrestrial slot.

In June 2022, ITV2 picked up a number of American series for daytimes including re-runs of One Tree Hill, Hart of Dixie and The O.C. as well as the sports drama All American, which had replaced Bob's Burgers in its timeslot. However, All American was unsuccessful in its 7pm slot and so after a month of consistently low ratings, it was moved mid-season to around 2am each morning, with Bob's Burgers returning on 4 July 2022. Despite this incident, in January 2023, ITV2 would later stop airing Bob's Burgers altogether and replace it with Superstore, a programme which ITV2 used to air until September 2022 when it got replaced by Secret Crush.

In August 2022, the channel axed its Katherine Ryan presented dating show Ready To Mingle after some episodes in the first series received ratings as low as 60,000 viewers, and picked up the rights to the Big Brother format, launching a teaser trailer for its return to British TV during the Love Island final.

On 7 October 2022, the ITV2 Twitter and YouTube accounts were replaced by ITVX accounts in order to streamline the ITV channels for an upcoming rebrand.

Most watched programmes

The following is a list of the six most watched shows on ITV2, based on Live +28 data supplied by BARB up to 10 January 2019.

Before Love Islands successful return, the highest rated show on the channel was episode 7.01 of Celebrity Juice, starring Phillip Schofield, on 9 February 2012.

 Awards 
ITV2 won Channel of the Year at the Broadcast Digital Awards in 2007 and again in 2013. It was also named Non-Terrestrial Channel of the Year at the Edinburgh International Television Festival in 2007.

Criticisms
In 2014, the channel was subject to a controversy about one of its shows. Dapper Laughs: On The Pull was created by Vine comedian Daniel "Dapper Laughs" O'Reilly. The show was criticized for promoting violence against women and dubbed by one paper as "a rapist's almanac". Due to these criticisms, an online petition for the show's cancellation reaching 68,210 signatures and a sexist joke glorifying rape said by O'Reilly during one of his live shows, ITV chose not to commission a second series. A subsequent live tour was also cancelled. In the wake of the scandal, Stewart Lee criticized O'Reilly's Newsnight apology and said "what kind of person gets banned from ITV2? That's like being banned from a pub that's on fire."

In a 2009 episode of Screenwipe, Black Mirror creator Charlie Brooker criticized the channel's programming for being nihilistic and called it "a monument to cultural death" and "frighteningly meaningless."

Subsidiary channels
ITV2 +1

The timeshift channel ITV2 +1 launched 30 October 2006, along with ITV3 +1. It was allocated channel number 211 on Sky. On 6 May 2008 it was announced that ITV2 +1 would swap with Men & Motors on the Sky EPG making a jump from 184 to 131. This channel is often unable to broadcast certain programmes "for legal reasons", but the programme in question might still be listed on the EPG.
ITV2 +1 currently resides on Sky channel 218, and is also available on Freeview channel 28, Freesat channel 114 and Virgin TV channel 116.

ITV2 HDITV2 HD, a high-definition simulcast of ITV2, launched on 7 October 2010 on Sky channel 225. The channel was initially available through Sky's pay subscription service in a non-exclusive deal, before being added to Virgin Media's service on 14 March 2013. Original HD programming includes entertainment shows, Britain's Got More Talent, The Xtra Factor and I'm a Celebrity: Extra Camp; original drama such as the third and fourth series of Secret Diary of a Call Girl; and acquired content including The Vampire Diaries and Gossip Girl and a range of movies.

On 1 November 2022, in the lead up to the launch of ITVX, the encryption was dropped on ITV2 HD at around 11am that day and so became free to air. Later that day, Freesat data had been added to ITV2 HD, indicating that the channel will be made available on Freesat soon. On 8 November 2022 the HD version replaced the SD version on Freesat channel 113.

 Former local variants 

 S2 S2 was a television station broadcast throughout the Scottish and Grampian ITV regions by SMG plc, the holder of the Scottish and Grampian region ITV franchises. S2, which aired on the digital terrestrial platform, was launched 30 April 1999 and closed just over two years later – as part of a deal with ITV Digital – on 27 July 2001.

By the end of its life, it had lost nearly all of its Scottish programmes and mainly simulcast ITV2, but covered the ITV2 graphic with an opaque S2 graphic.

 UTV2 UTV2 was a television station broadcast by Ulster Television on Digital Terrestrial Television in Northern Ireland. It was launched in 1999 as TV You. The programming consisted primarily of simulcasts with the ITV2 station shown in England, Wales and the Scottish Borders, although they did also use archive broadcasts from UTV. UTV2 closed on 22 January 2002 following a deal with ITV Digital and was replaced by the national variant.

 Branding 
When the channel launched, the logo was very similar in style to the ITV logo at the time and ITV were worried the channel looked just like an extension of ITV and didn't offer anything new. It was soon after this that the channel received a complete overhaul along with the other ITV channels in 2006.
The channel received a new lime green logo, chosen as ITV thought it had a young fresh feel to it. The channel also received six new idents which all had names beginning with 'Too' to relate to the 2 in the channel's name. They were called; "Too Fast", "Too Hot", "Too Cold, "Too Expensive", "Too Glamorous" and "Too Loud". Each of the idents were made up of a mix of shades of green to match the channel's logo.

In 2008, the channel received another new look. The green logo was kept but edited. The channel now had a new 3D logo to try to make the channel look more modern and appealing to a younger audience.

During Newcastle United's run in the 2004–05 UEFA Cup, the channel was rebranded as ITV Toon''' on matchdays, referring to the club's nickname the Toon. The channel's yellow and blue idents changed to black and white, to match the club's colours.

In line with the corporate rebranding of ITV, ITV2 received a new look on 14 January 2013. The channel's slogan became "the home of infectious entertainment", and received a "hot red" version of the logo and red on-screen identity including new idents.

ITV2 presentation was given a refresh on 12 August 2015, with new branding, idents, the introduction of gif style bite-sized promos, and a re-boot of the channel's social feeds, spanning YouTube, Facebook, Twitter and Instagram along with the launch of new ITV2 channels on Snapchat and Tumblr. As part of the refresh, the logo kept its previous state but was changed colour from hot red to turquoise.

ITV2 was given another rebrand on 15 November 2022, with new branding and idents along with the launch of the streaming service ITVX. As part of the refresh, the logo is now coloured pink and uses idents that are cross-used across ITV1, ITV3, ITV4, and ITVBe with different views which reflect the channel's image and programming output.

Former logos

Programming

Current programming
Programmes getting their first-run on a British TV channel:

 All American (2022–present)
 American Dad! (2016–present)
 Bad Boy Chiller Crew (2021–present)
 Big Brother (2023–present)
 Crossing Swords (2020–present)
 Dress To Impress (2017–present)
 Don't Hate the Playaz (2018–present)
 The Emily Atack Show (2020–present)
 Emergency Nurses (2022–present)
 Family Guy (2016–present)
 Killer Camp (2019–present) ITV Hightlights Christmas/Winter 2021/2022 
 Love Island (2015–present)
 Love Island: Aftersun (2017–present)
 Love Island: Unseen Bits (2019–present)
 The Masked Singer US (2020–present, from season 2: Fox produced episodes only)
 Peckham's Finest (2021–present)
 The Social Media Murders (2021–present)
 The Stand-Up Sketch Show (2019–present)
 Supermarket Sweep (2019–present)
 The Voice USA (2021–present)

Second-run programmes currently showing

 Chuck (2022–present)
 Coronation Street Hart of Dixie (2022–present)
 Hey Tracey (2019–2020)
 Masked Singer UK (2021–present)
 The O.C. (2022–present)
 One Tree Hill (2022–present)
 Release the Hounds (2013–2018)
 Superstore (2018–2021, 2023–present)
 Take Me Out (2010–2019)
 Veronica Mars (2022–present)

Former programmesThis list is incomplete. American Idol  (seasons 1–11, 2002–2012)
 America's Got Talent (2007–2012)
 Big Rich Texas (2013–2014)
 Bob's Burgers (2021–2022)
 Bordertown (2016)
 Britain's Got More Talent (2007–2019)
 The Cabins (2021–2022)
 Celebrity Juice (2008–2022)
 The Cleveland Show (2016–2021)
 The Ellen DeGeneres Show (2016–2022)
 Dapper Laughs: On the Pull (2014)
 Emmerdale (1998–2022)
 Gossip Girl (2007–2012)
 Holly & Fearne Go Dating  (2007)
 Home Alone With Joel Dommett (2020)
 I'm a Celebrity: Extra Camp (2002–2019)
 Jedward: Let Loose  (2010)
 The Jeremy Kyle Show (2005–2019)
 Late Show with David Letterman Love Island USA (2020)
 Love Island Australia (2020)
 Nicola McLean: Studs and Stilettos  (2009)
 The Only Way Is Essex (2010–2014)
 Paris Hilton's British Best Friend (2009)
 Plebs (2013–2022)
 Ready to Mingle (2021)
 The Real Housewives Reality Bites (2015)
 Streetmate  (2007 series)
 Timewasters (2017–2019)
 The Vampire Diaries (2010–2017)
 The Xtra Factor  (2004–2016)
 Two and a Half Men (2014–2021)
 You've Been Framed!'' (2009–2022)

References

External links 
 

1998 establishments in the United Kingdom
ITV television channels
Television channels and stations established in 1998
Television channels in the United Kingdom